The Big Chance is a 1933 American Pre-Code crime film directed by Albert Herman. It was produced by the independent Eagle Pictures and released on the states-rights market.

Cast
John Darrow as Knockout Frankie (Rocky) Morgan
Merna Kennedy as Mary Wilson
Natalie Moorhead as Babe
Mickey Rooney as Arthur Wilson
Matthew Betz as Flash McQuaid
Hank Mann as Tugboat
Virginia True Boardman as Mrs. Wilson (uncredited)

External links 

1933 films
1933 adventure films
1930s crime films
1930s romance films
American black-and-white films
American boxing films
Films scored by Bernard B. Brown
Films scored by Norman Spencer (composer)
Films directed by Albert Herman
1930s English-language films
1930s American films